George A. Stephen, Sr. (February 26, 1921 – February 11, 1993) was an American inventor, entrepreneur, and the founder of Weber-Stephen Products Co., the company best known for the manufacturing of charcoal and gas grills.  Stephen is credited with the invention of the Weber Kettle grill by cutting a metal buoy in half and fashioning a dome shaped grill with a rounded lid, which he began selling in 1952.

External links
 Weber Corporate Website
 Weber Grill Restaurant

References 

American manufacturing businesspeople
1993 deaths
People from Palatine, Illinois
Deaths from cancer in Illinois
1921 births
20th-century American businesspeople
Engineers from Illinois
20th-century American engineers
20th-century American inventors